Dario di Giovanni (1420 – 1495), was an Italian painter of the Renaissance period.

Biography
Di Giovanni was born in Pordenone and is known for religious works. By 1440 he was registered in Padua as pictor vagabundus, meaning journeyman painter, indicating that he was not associated with any workshop in particular. This fits with Di Giovanni's oeuvre, which was primarily frescoes in churches.

Di Giovanni died in Conegliano.

References

Dario di Giovanni on answers.com

1420 births
1495 deaths
15th-century Italian painters
Italian male painters
Italian Renaissance painters
People from Pordenone